As You Like It is a 2006 romance film written and directed by Kenneth Branagh, based on William Shakespeare's play of the same name. The film stars Romola Garai, Bryce Dallas Howard, Kevin Kline, Adrian Lester, Janet McTeer, Alfred Molina, David Oyelowo and Brian Blessed in a dual role.

Transferring the play's setting to a late 19th-century European colony in Japan after the Meiji Restoration, filming took place at Shepperton Film Studios and at the never-before-filmed gardens of Wakehurst Place. Produced by The Shakespeare Film Company and financed by HBO Films and BBC Films, it is the fifth and to date, the most recent Shakespeare adaptation by Branagh, and the only one not to feature Branagh himself in the cast, though he has a vocal cameo towards the end of the film.

The film premiered in Italy on 1 September 2006 before being released by Picturehouse in the United States on 21 August 2007 and by Lionsgate in the United Kingdom on 21 September 2007. It received mixed reviews from critics.

The Japanese setting 

Although the film was not made in Japan, Branagh sets the play there during the late nineteenth century among English traders. Branagh portrays Duke Senior's court as a British outpost whose ruler admires Japanese culture:  although most of the inhabitants wear European clothes, Duke Senior and his brother both wear Japanese clothes. Each British lady at the outpost covers her face modestly with a fan, and styles her hair in a Japanese manner. When the banished characters travel to the Forest of Arden, both Japanese and western actors portray its inhabitants: Phoebe and William are Japanese, Corin and Audrey are European, while Silvius is a European who wears Japanese clothes. Black British actors play the de Boys brothers, Orlando and Oliver, Orlando fights a sumo wrestler.

Branagh invented a prologue in which ninja warriors attack Duke Senior's family as it attends a performance of Kabuki theatre. Branagh's prologue defines exactly the moment that Duke Frederick usurps his brother's kingdom, a moment that Shakespeare's play does not.

The epilogue deliberately interrupts the closing credits with Rosalind's speech, as the camera pans to see Rosalind's actor, Bryce Dallas Howard, walking to her dressing trailer on the film's location.

Despite the cultural transposition, Shakespeare's text and the names of his characters remain the same. The film closely follows Shakespeare's plot. Although some critics praised the setting, others found it useless and irrelevant since few of the characters are Japanese.

Cast

Release 
The film was released theatrically in Italy on 1 September 2006, in Greece on 7 September 2006, and in the UK on 21 September 2007.

In the United States, HBO began airing the film on TV on the evening of 21 August 2007, but it has never had a true theatrical release in the US, only occasional one-time showings, and most of these US showings took place after the film's television premiere. It is the only one of Branagh's Shakespeare films to be released directly to television instead of to theatres in the US.

The DVD was released in the US on 25 September 2007.

Reception 
Review aggregator website Rotten Tomatoes reports that 36% of 14 surveyed critics gave it a positive review; the average rating is 4.67/10. Another aggregator, Metacritic, rated it 75/100 based on 15 reviews.

Philip French of The Observer called it less successful than Branagh's previous Shakespeare adaptations.  Peter Bradshaw of The Guardian rated it 3/5 stars and wrote that it "deserves a look".  Anthony Quinn of The Independent rated it 1/5 stars and wrote, "[T]he only way you could make the spiralling absurdities of As You Like It work would be to transform it into a fast-paced comedy".  Many American critics called the film a "comeback" for Branagh's Shakespeare adaptations, which had reached what many considered a low point with Love's Labour's Lost. A negative US reviewer was film critic Stanley Kauffmann, who had admired Branagh's film versions of Henry V, Much Ado About Nothing, and Hamlet; he blasted the film, saying that he could barely get through it, and that, by giving it such an unusual setting, Branagh seemed to be trying to "apologize" to the viewing audience for the fact that As You Like It was a Shakespeare film. Critic Virginia Heffernan, writing for The New York Times, was also negative, pointing out that film reduces the role of main character Rosalind: "Mr. Branagh has teased out every manly rivalry and preserved every hey-nonny-nonny of the kooks in the Forest of Arden, but slashed passages of the repartee that defines Rosalind."

Awards 
In January 2008 Kevin Kline received a SAG award (Outstanding Performance by a Male Actor in a Television Movie or Miniseries) for his performance in this film, although strictly speaking, the film is not a made-for-television movie; made-for-TV films do not play theatrically in other countries before being released directly to TV in the US; they do so afterwards. This makes Kline the first actor to win a major US award for acting in one of Branagh's Shakespeare films, though some of his others have won critics' awards for the acting in them.

Likewise, Bryce Dallas Howard received a Golden Globe Award nomination for Best Actress in a Made-for-TV Film or Miniseries, but did not win the award.

References

External links 
 
 
 
 
 September 1st 2006 – opening in Italy

2000s historical comedy films
2006 films
American historical comedy films
American films based on plays
British historical comedy films
British films based on plays
British historical films
2000s English-language films
Films based on As You Like It
Films about interracial romance
Films directed by Kenneth Branagh
Films scored by Patrick Doyle
Films set in Japan
Films set in the 19th century
2000s American films
2000s British films